A loment (or lomentum) is a type of dehiscent legume fruit that breaks apart at constrictions occurring between segments, so that each segment contains one seed. It is a type of schizocarp.

Tick trefoil (Desmodium) and sweet vetch (Hedysarum) are two genera that exhibit this fruit type, which is found particularly in the tribe Hedysareae of the family Fabaceae.

References

Fruit morphology
Fabaceae